The Hewes Street station is a local station on the BMT Jamaica Line of the New York City Subway. Located at the intersection of Hewes Street and Broadway in Brooklyn, it is served by the J train at all times except weekdays in the peak direction and the M train at all times except late nights. The Z train skips this station when it operates.

History 
The Union Elevated Railroad, leased to the Brooklyn Elevated Railroad, opened an elevated line above Broadway from Gates Avenue northwest to Driggs Avenue in Williamsburg on June 25, 1888, with a station at Hewes Street.

Station layout

This elevated station, built four stories above street level, has two side platforms and three tracks. The center track is used by the J and Z trains in the peak direction weekday midday and rush hours. Each platform has beige windscreens, green canopies, and red roofs that run from end to end.

The artwork here is called El in 16 Notes by Mara Held. It features sixteen panels of art glass, each containing random geometric shapes and is based on shapes found in dress patterns.

Exits
The station has exits on both the west (railroad north) end and the east (railroad south) end of its platforms.

On the west end, each platform has a single staircase leading to an elevated station house beneath the tracks. It has a turnstile bank and token booth. Outside of fare control, two staircases lead to the western corners of Broadway and Hooper Street. Each staircase landing has an exit-only turnstile to allow passengers to exit without having to go through the station house.

On the east end, each platform has a single staircase leading to a turnstile bank. Outside of fare control, a single staircase from each side leads to the eastern corners of Broadway and Hewes Street. The station house has been removed. These exits were closed in the 1980s due to high crime and served as emergency exits until 2018. They were reopened on November 16, 2018 to accommodate L train riders who would be displaced during the 14th Street Tunnel shutdown in 2019–2020. The transfer was honored through the end of May 2020, even though L train tunnel work was completed on April 26.

Gallery

References

External links 

 
 Station Reporter — J Train
 Station Reporter — M Train
 The Subway Nut — Hewes Street Pictures 
 MTA's Arts For Transit — Hewes Street (BMT Jamaica Line)
 Hooper Street entrance from Google Maps Street View
 Hewes Street entrance from Google Maps Street View
 Platforms from Google Maps Street View

BMT Jamaica Line stations
1888 establishments in New York (state)
New York City Subway stations in Brooklyn
Railway stations in the United States opened in 1888
Williamsburg, Brooklyn